Saroj Bal (born 2 February 1976) is a Odia language poet from India. He is also a translator and editor of several literary journals.

Biography
Saroj Bal was born on 2 February 1976 at village Arjunbindha in Bhadrak district of Odisha, India. He completed his post graduate education in Odia literature from Utkal University. He has pursued creative writing as his career, besides working as a digital designer, musician, journalist and literary activist. He is also a publisher with his own publication house "Time Pass". He has designed several books as a graphic illustrator.

Works
Saroj Bal has written fourteen poetry books, four collections of short stories and one novel. he has edited several literary journals including "Saamanaa", "Sindoor" and "Rebati". His poems have been widely translated into English language. He regularly performs his poetry at national literary festivals. In 2022 Saroj Bal's Odia poems translated by Snehaprava Das won Jibanananda Das Award for poetry. His poems on inclusivity and togetherness graced the Kolkata Poetry Confluence.

Awards
 Katha Naba Pratibha Award
 Basanta Muduli Kabita Award
 State Youth Award
 Kadambini Feature Award
 Rabi Patnaik Memorial Award

Bibliography

Novels
 2012 :- Bahare Barasa

Poetry
 2022 :- Raatira Bati
 2022 :- Prema Pahandi
 2018 :- Samay Saha Selfie
 2018 :- Udaya Raag
 2014 :- Saata Dinare Goraapana
 2012 :- Tu Marichikaa ku Mun Marubhoomi
 2010 :- Power Cut

Translation into other languages
 Sunshine in Janpath (Translated by Harmendra Singh)
 जन पथ में धूप (Translated by Shankar Lal Purohit)

Magazines edited by Saroj Bal
 Saamanaa
 Sindoor
 Rebati
 Maata
 Pustak Melaa haalchaal

References 

1976 births
Odia-language writers
Living people
Writers from Odisha
Poets from Odisha
Indian male poets
20th-century Indian poets
Indian magazine editors
20th-century Indian male writers